Eagle Eye Art Academy is a Texan school of film and acting.

Eagle Eye Art Academy, EEAA

The Eagle Eye Academy Art Academy of Performing Arts EEAA is an institutional school of Art. Eagle Eye Art Academy was incorporated as a private entity.

Founders: Beginnings

In 2011 the director, actor and film and television producer Juan Carlos Hernández Nava along with the TV host and actress Tatiana Smithhart began the acting school, Eagle Eye Art Academy. Eagle Eye Art Academy is structured to prepare students for careers in film and entertainment. Currently Juan Carlos Hernández Nava and Tatiana stands as President of this institution and Vice-President of the entity.

The school is located in San Antonio, Texas, United States

EEAA teaches:

 Performance
 Theater
 Address
 Production
 Dance
 Contemporary music
 Arts management

It also conducts workshops with actors of high rename in the industry, as artists in residence to work with students on productions and performances.

Direction

The Academy is directed by the actor and writer of screenplays Eric del Castillo. Eric del Castillo has participated in nearly 300 films and has directed five of them. He studied for a year at the Seminary of Foreign Missions who left to devote to Drama for which he moved to Mexico City in 1955 to study at the Institute Andrés Soler. He is the father of the host of Univision Veronica del Castillo and actress Kate del Castillo.

External links
Www.eagleeyeaa.com 
  https://web.archive.org/web/20120402085618/http://www.eagleipro.com/

References

Drama schools in the United States
Private universities and colleges in Texas
Theatre in Texas
Education in San Antonio